C130 or C-130 may refer to :
 Lockheed C-130 Hercules, a large aircraft, mainly used to transport cargo
 C130J, an upgraded version of C130
 Bombardier CSeries C130, a 130-seat variant of the Bombardier CSeries aircraft family, later redesignated CS300, now called Airbus A220-300
 Medical Care and Sickness Benefits Convention, 1969 code